Columbus Square is a historic public square in the Historic Elmwood Neighborhood of Providence, Rhode Island.  It is located at the intersection of Elmwood Avenue and Reservoir Avenue.  It serves as a gateway to Elmwood from the Reservoir and West End Neighborhoods.

Description

Columbus Square is the heart of the Elmwood Avenue business district that abuts the South Elmwood Historic District. After June 2020, the location consists of a fenced triangle of land, half paved-over with brick, with about a dozen trees and a square granite slab where the Columbus statue once stood. It is also home to nearby charter school, Paul Cuffee Upper School independent middle school Sophia Academy, several car dealers, a drug store, a sandwich shop, and an electrical supply company.

History
The small triangular plot of land was originally owned by Joseph Cooke, who deeded to the Town of Cranston on May 24, 1824. Cranston in turn deeded it to Providence in 1868. It was renamed Columbus Park in 1893 in honor of a bronze statue of Columbus which was erected in on the small plot on the occasion of the 400th anniversary of Columbus's landing.

Columbus Statue
Columbus square was notable for its bronze statue, Columbus, designed by French sculptor Frédéric Auguste Bartholdi and cast in bronze in 1893 by the historic Gorham Manufacturing Company, which was located nearby on Adelaide Avenue.  The statue, of Christopher Columbus, is a recasting of a statue prepared in sterling silver by the Gorham company for the Columbian World's Fair in Chicago, 1893.  The statue is listed on the National Register of Historic Places and is sited in Columbus Square Park, a public park of the City of Providence Parks Department.

Removal of Columbus Statue

In June 2020, on the order of mayor Jorge Elorza, the Columbus statue was removed from Columbus Square. The order was given as a response to statue removals across the United States in the wake of George Floyd protests. During the removal, dozens of people from the neighborhood gathered to cheer. The city has not disclosed where the statue would be stored, nor what would be its fate.

See also
Neighborhoods in Providence
Elmwood Neighborhood

References

Squares in Providence, Rhode Island